Tachizaki (written: 細山田) is a Japanese surname. Notable people with the surname include:

, Japanese biathlete
, Japanese biathlete

Japanese-language surnames